Habib-ur-Rehman (26 November 1929 – 25 February 2016), better known by his screen name Habib, was a Pakistani film actor, director, producer and a television actor. He was one of the busiest heroes of the Pakistani film industry and established himself as one of the most successful actors of Pakistani cinema, acting in almost 600 movies in a career spanning 60 years. He appeared in both Punjabi and Urdu language movies.

Early years and personal life
Habib-ur-Rehman was born into Punjabi family of the Arain tribe, in Basi village not far from Sirhind-Fategarh in the Patiala State, Punjab, British India. His father worked in the railways, and the family had to move to Gujranwala after the independence of Pakistan in 1947, where he was educated, earning three master's degrees in English literature, Urdu and Persian from the Govt. M.A.O College Lahore.

He married fellow film actress Naghma in 1972, but later separated and got divorced from her in 1988. Habib was the father of two sons and four daughters from his first wife who had died some years ago, and another daughter later from his second wife, actress Naghma. He then married Shaheen Habib and they lived together for 36 years until his death in 2016.

Khalid Tabassum, journalist & writer, wrote his film memories which were published in Daily Nawa-i-Waqt in 1986.

Career

As an actor
He made his debut in film Lakhat-e-Jigar (1956), then some of his films flopped till Aadmi (1958). He received an important role in the film Aadmi (1958), breaking through obscurity and first became well-known as a film actor, and soon took other roles in Urdu hit films such as Ayyaz (1960), Zehr-e-Ishq (1958), Surayya (1961), Saperan (1961), Aulad (1962), Mehtab, Maa Ke Aansoo, Khandan, Aashiyana (1964), Fashion, Dil Ke Tukrey, Basheera (1972), Eid Mubarak (1965), Dil Aur Duniya, Haar Geya Insaan and Waqt.

Among his Punjabi films, Mouj Mela (1963) was a super-hit musical Golden Jubilee film. He took the role of a side-hero in Platinum Jubilee film, Jeedar (1965), but he could not repeat this success until 1967. Dil Da Jani (1967), Yaar Maar, Babul Da Wehra (1968), Chann Makhna (1968), Do Mutiyaran (1968), Chann Veer (1969), Mukhra Chann Warga, Genterman (1969), Waryam, Att Khuda Da Vair (1970), Chann Puttar (1970), Taxi Driver (1970), Rangu Jatt (1970), Duniya Paise Di (1971), Sajjan Be-Parwah, Ik Doli Do Kahar, Basheera (1972), Do Pattar Annaran Dey (1972), Zaildar (1972), Khushiya and "Malanga (1986)" are his Punjabi films.

In television, his most famous role was in the PTV drama Rahain, in the late 1990s.

As a director
He directed and produced two Sindhi films, Baaghi and Allah Bachayo, but without much success.

As a producer
He was not successful as a film producer. Pardes and Haar Gaya Insaan were average box office films. Some other films he had produced had also flopped at the box office.

Death
Habib-ur-Rehman suffered a brain haemorrhage a week before his death. At that time, he was admitted to Ittefaq Hospital, Lahore for treatment where he died on 25 February 2016.

Selected filmography

Urdu
 Lakht-e-Jigar (1956)
 Aadmi (1958)
 Zehr E Ishq (1958)
 Izzat (1960)
 Ayyaz (1960)
 Saperan (1961)
 Aulad (1962)
 Dulhana (1963)
 Ashiana (1964)
 Devdas (1965)
 Eid Mubarak (1965)
 Taj Mahal (1968)

Punjabi
 Mouj Mela (1963)
 Jeedar (1965)
 Dil Da Jani (1967)
 Chan Makhana (1968)
 Mukhra Chann Warga (1969)
 Att Khuda Da Vair (1970)
 Basheera (1972)
 Khushia (1973)
 Ik Madari (1973)
 Naukar Wohti Da (1974)
 Dara Baloch (1983)
 Rustam Tey Khan (1983) 
 Gernail Singh (1987)

Awards
1958 – Nigar Award for Best Actor - film Aadmi1961 – Nigar Award for Best Actor - film Surayya''
2002 – Nigar Award Lifetime Achievement Award
2011 – Pride of Performance Award by the President of Pakistan

References

External links
 

1929 births
2016 deaths
Pakistani male film actors
Pakistani film directors
Pakistani film producers
Pakistani male television actors
Nigar Award winners
Recipients of the Pride of Performance
Punjabi people
Male actors in Punjabi cinema
Male actors in Urdu cinema
Male actors in Pashto cinema
Male actors in Sindhi cinema